Pfaffenhausen is a municipality in the district of Unterallgäu in Bavaria, Germany. The town is seat of a municipal association with Breitenbrunn, Swabia, Oberrieden, Bavaria and Salgen.

References

Unterallgäu